Franca Marzi (18 August 1926 – 6 March 1989) was an Italian film actress. She appeared in 80 films between 1943 and 1977.

Life and career
Born in Rome as Francesca Marsi, after working in the revue, Marzi made her film debut in her early twenties, in The Lovers (1946) by Giacomo Gentilomo. She was usually cast in roles of provocative women and femme fatales in films of sentimental or comic genre.  The only exception was the Federico Fellini's drama Nights of Cabiria (1957), in which she played the role of the prostitute Wanda, the best friend of Giulietta Masina, a role for which she was rewarded with the Silver Ribbon for Best Supporting Actress.

Selected filmography

 Harlen (1943) - Une spettatrice al teatro
 The Lovers (1946) - Porzia
 Tombolo (1947) - Lidia
 The Two Orphans (1947) - Susanne de la Pleine
 Mad About Opera (1948) - Carmen
 L'isola di Montecristo (1948) - Lucy
 Letter at Dawn (1948) - Lilly - l'amante di Carlo
 Fear and Sand (1948) - Carmen
 Calamità d'oro (1948) - Rosetta 'Calamita d'oro'
 A Night of Fame (1949) - Flora
 Totò Le Mokò (1949) - Odette
 The Pirates of Capri (1949) - Carla
 Napoli eterna canzone (1949) - Stella Paris
 Maracatumba... ma non è una rumba! (1949) - Corinna Auselli, figlia del fattore
 La figlia del peccato (1949) - l'ex amante di Ernesto
 Ho sognato il paradiso (1950) - Collega di Maria
 Son of d'Artagnan (1950) - La Contessa
 Figaro Here, Figaro There (1950) - Consuelo
 Devotion (1950) - Zana, la vedova
 Beauties on Bicycles (1951) - Maria
 Arrivano i nostri (1951) - Gioia Chellis
 The Black Captain (1951)
 Milano miliardaria (1951) - Italia Furioni
 Verginità (1951) - Giulia
 Toto the Third Man (1951) - Teresa - la domestica di Paolo
 La vendetta del corsaro (1951)
 La paura fa 90 (1951) - Nanda Fougère
 Revenge of Black Eagle (1951) - Katia
 My Heart Sings (1951) - Gina
 Amor non ho! Però, però.. (1951)
 Vedi Napoli e poi muori (1951) - Wanda
 Tizio, Caio, Sempronio (1951) - Livia
 Santa Lucia Luntana (1951)
 Salvate mia figlia (1951) - Ex Amante di Andrea
 Lorenzaccio (1951) - Clarice
 La voce del sangue (1952)
 Sardinian Vendetta (1952) - Annesa Leoni
 The Black Mask (1952) - Henriette
 Tragic Return (1952) - Donna Carmela - Nicola's girlfriend
 At Sword's Edge (1952) - Rita
 They Were Three Hundred (1952) - Sina
 Final Pardon (1952)
 Non ho paura di vivere (1952)
 I, Hamlet (1952) - Valchiria
 I morti non pagano tasse (1952) - Mariella, la locandiera
 Delitto al luna park (1952) - Silvia
 I Piombi di Venezia (1953) - Fabia
 Cavallina storna (1953) - Donna Angela
 Carcerato (1953) - Valeria - matrigna di Luisa
 Riscatto (1953) - L'ostessa
 Fermi tutti... arrivo io! (1953) - Carmen
 Rivalità (1953) - Franca
 Lasciateci in pace (1953)
 Cavallina storna (1953) - Dalgisa
 Canzoni a due voci (1953) - Governante Franca
 Canto per te (1953) - Luciana
 The Island Monster (1954) - Gloria D'Auro
 Il cavaliere di Maison Rouge (1954)
 The Doctor of the Mad (1954) - La moglie di Cristaldi
 The Boatman of Amalfi (1954) - Cristina
 Orphan of the Ghetto (1954)
 Suor Maria (1955) - Assunta Ranieri
 La trovatella di Milano (1956)
 Nights of Cabiria (1957) - Wanda
 Fortunella (1958) - Amelia
 Girls for the Summer (1958) - Clara
 Ritrovarsi all'alba (1959) - Paola
 Il raccomandato di ferro (1959) - Tosca
 Gastone (1960) - Rosa
 Toto, Fabrizi and the Young People Today (1960) - Matilde Cocozza
 La contessa azzurra (1960) - Donna Carmela
 La garçonnière (1960) - Mother
 Ghosts of Rome (1961) - Nella
 Psycosissimo (1962) - Clotilde Scarponi
 The Man Who Burnt His Corpse (1964)
 Le tardone (1964) - Donna Carla (episode "Canto flamenco")
 Pardon, Are You For or Against? (1966) - Camilla
 Ecco noi per esempio... (1977)

References

External links

1926 births
1989 deaths
Italian film actresses
Nastro d'Argento winners
20th-century Italian actresses
Actresses from Rome